Birgit Nordin (22 February 1934 – 7 April 2022) was a Swedish operatic soprano. She was a member of the Royal Swedish Opera from 1958 to 1986, and regularly appeared at the Drottningholm Festival where she performed twelve major Mozart roles, including Susanna in Le nozze di Figaro and Pamina in The Magic Flute. She also performed internationally, appearing in the Edinburgh International Festival, Glyndebourne Festival, Copenhagen and others. She became known as the Queen of the Night in Trollflöjten, Ingmar Bergman's film adaptation of Mozart's opera.

Life and career 
Born in Sangis, Norrbotten, Nordin attended school in Haparanda. She attended the Royal College of Music in Stockholm from 1956 to 1958, studying under Britta von Vegesack. Later she trained with Lina Pagliughi in Italy.

Nordin joined the company of the Royal Swedish Opera in Stockholm, where she worked from 1958 to 1986. Her debut was as Oscar in Verdi's Masked Ball on 21 October 1958 and she was part of the company that visited London and the Edinburgh International Festival in 1960.  Starting in 1960, she regularly appeared at the Drottningholm Festival where she performed twelve major Mozart roles, including Susanna in Le nozze di Figaro and Pamina in The Magic Flute. In 1968, she participated in the world premiere of Franz Berwald's Drottningen av Golconda, with Elisabeth Söderström in the title role.

Abroad, Nordin appeared at the 1968 Glyndebourne Festival as Blonde in Mozart's Die Entführung aus dem Serail. She performed the role of Jenny Smith in Rise and Fall of the City of Mahagonny in Copenhagen in 1970, and appeared on Danish television as Lulu, also singing in Bach's St Matthew Passion in Berlin that year. Other roles included Gilda in Verdi's Rigoletto, Rosina in Rossini's Il barbiere di Siviglia and Mélisande in Debussy's Pelléas et Mélisande.

Nordin held the Christina Nilsson Fellowship twice, and was appointed a Hovsångerska (court singer) in 1973. She appeared in the 1975 film Trollflöjten, Mozart's opera film adaption of Mozart's opera sung in Swedish, directed by Ingmar Bergman as the Queen of the Night.

After retiring from the stage, Nordin undertook some teaching and stage direction.

Private life 
Since 1977, Nordin was married to the Swedish bass–baritone  (1939–2007).

She died on 7 April 2022 at age 88.

Recordings

Compilations

Video

References

Further reading

External links
  archived on 2013-06-10
 
 
 Birgit Nordin (recordings) muziekweb.nl

1934 births
2022 deaths
Swedish operatic sopranos
People from Kalix Municipality
Royal College of Music, Stockholm alumni
20th-century Swedish women  opera singers